Marjorie Barrett born Lucy Marjory East (1889-1968) was an English badminton player.

Biography
She started playing badminton in the village of Shaldon in Devon where Meriel Lucas tutored her. After becoming a member of the Crystal Palace Club she married Frederick Barrett in 1915. The left hander became a force after the war and secured five All England singles titles.

Her husband died in 1932 and she remarried in 1949 to another badminton player Percy Macfarlane. She died in 1968, aged 79 in Newton Abbott. Her brother Frederick Arthur Dudley East married Dorothy Lyon, another leading badminton player at the time.

Medal Record at the All England Badminton Championships

References

English female badminton players
1889 births
1968 deaths